The Bacchante class was a group of three iron screw corvettes in service with the Royal Navy from the late 1870s.

Design and construction
The ships were designed by Nathaniel Barnaby in 1872, with the first two ordered from Portsmouth Royal Dockyard in 1872 and Euryalus from Chatham Royal Dockyard in 1873. These were the last ships to be built of iron for the Royal Navy, with teak planking. Although similar, the three ships differed in design and appearance, and thus did not technically form a single class. A fourth ship (Highflyer) was ordered in 1878 from Portsmouth Dockyard, but was cancelled in 1879. In 1887, like all the remaining corvettes, they were redesignated cruisers by the Royal Navy.

Ships

References

Corvette classes
 
 Bacchante